Eupithecia ensifera is a moth in the family Geometridae. It is found in western China (Qinghai).

The wingspan is about 22 mm. The forewings are pale brown and the hindwings are very pale brown.

References

Moths described in 2004
ensifera
Moths of Asia